The Helms Apartments, at 2248-2250 Jefferson Ave. in Ogden, Utah, was built during 1916 to 1919.  It was listed on the United States National Register of Historic Places in 1987.

It is a two-and-a-half-story brick apartment building, upon a concrete foundation, with two apartments on each of three levels.  It was deemed "one of the smallest, yet most visually interesting of 21 pre-Depression apartment buildings identified in Ogden."

The listing includes two garages behind the apartment building as contributing buildings.

It was built by Ogden contractor Charles J. Humphries or Humphreys.

References

National Register of Historic Places in Weber County, Utah

Prairie School architecture
Residential buildings completed in 1916